Fauj is an Indian Bollywood movie released in 1994, directed  by Ashok Gaikwad and produced by Gurunam Kaur. The main casts in the movie are Kamal Sadanah, Farheen, Madhoo and Kiran Kumar.

Cast
 Kamal Sadanah
 Farheen
 Madhoo
 Kiran Kumar
 Sudesh Berry
 Sanjeev Dhabholkar
 Ajinkya Deo
 Tinu Anand
 Aruna Irani
 Tej Sapru
Avinash Wadhawan

Music
" Dil Pe Likh De Tera Naam" - Udit Narayan, Sadhana Sargam
"Sare Zamane Se Keh Do" - Udit Narayan, Sadhana Sargam
"Seedha Saada Bhola Bhala" - Udit Narayan, Sadhana Sargam
"Tarana Mere Dil Ka" - Kumar Sanu
"Tere Naam Jawani Likh Dali - Lata Mangeshkar, Udit Narayan
"Teri Nazar Ne Humko Apne Liye Chuna Hai" - Kumar Sanu, Kavita Krishnamurthy
"Teri Nazar Ne Humko Apne Liye Chuna Hai v2 - Kumar Sanu, Kavita Krishnamurthy
"Tumko Chhu Ke Kiya Hai Humne Vaada" - Kumar Sanu, Kavita Krishnamurthy

References

1990s Hindi-language films
Pakistan Navy in fiction
Pakistan in fiction
India in fiction
Films scored by Raamlaxman
Indian Army in films